Ro-114 was an Imperial Japanese Navy Ro-100-class submarine. Completed and commissioned in November 1943, she served in World War II and was sunk in June 1944 during her first war patrol.

Design and description
The Ro-100 class was a medium-sized, coastal submarine derived from the preceding Kaichū type. They displaced  surfaced and  submerged.

For surface running, the boats were powered by two  diesel engines, each driving one propeller shaft. When submerged each propeller was driven by a  electric motor. They could reach  on the surface and  underwater.

The boats were armed with four internal bow  torpedo tubes and carried a total of eight torpedoes. They were also armed with two single mounts for  Type 96 anti-aircraft guns or a single  L/40 AA gun.

Construction and commissioning

Ro-114 was laid down as Submarine No. 405 on 12 October 1942 by Kawasaki at Senshu, Japan. She had been renamed Ro-114 by the time she was launched on 19 June 1943. She then was towed to Kawasaki's shipyard at Kobe, Japan, for fitting-out. She was completed and commissioned at Kobe on 20 November 1943.

Service history

November 1943–June 1944

Upon commissioning, Ro-114 was attached to the Kure Naval District and was assigned to Submarine Squadron 11 for workups. On 20 December 1942, her commanding officer received orders to attend the Kure Submarine School to take a class on the new Type 92 electric torpedo.

On 7 February 1944, Ro-114 was reassigned to the headquarters of the Grand Escort Command to conduct antisubmarine operations in the Ryukyu Islands. She was reassigned to Submarine Division 30 in Submarine Squadron 8 on 20 February 1944,  and on 11 March 1944 departed Kure for her first combat duty, an antisubmarine patrol in the Ryukyus under the direction of the Grand Escort Command.

Submarine Division 30 was disbanded on 25 March 1944, and that day Ro-114 was reassigned to Submarine Division 51. She departed Kure on 1 June 1944 bound for Saeki, then departed Saeki on 4 June 1944 to head for Saipan in the Mariana Islands, which she reached in early June 1944.

First war patrol

Ro-114 got underway from Saipan on 11 June 1944 for her first war patrol, assigned a patrol area off Saipan itself. On 12 June 1944, she reported that he had arrived in her patrol area.

On 13 June 1944 the Combined Fleet activated Operation A-Go for the defense of the Mariana Islands, and that day the commander-in-chief of the 6th Fleet, Vice Admiral Takeo Takagi, ordered all 18 submarines available to him to deploy east of the Marianas. The Battle of Saipan began with U.S. landings on Saipan on 15 June 1944. That day, the 6th Fleet ordered most of its submarines, including Ro-114, to withdraw from the Marianas.

Loss

The submarine Melvin and Wadleigh sank probably was Ro-114. On 12 July 1944, the Imperial Japanese Navy declared Ro-114 to be presumed lost in the Philippines area with all 55 men on board. The Japanese struck her from the Navy list on 10 August 1944.

Notes

References
 

1943 ships
Ships built by Kawasaki Heavy Industries
World War II submarines of Japan
Japanese submarines lost during World War II
Ro-100-class submarines
Maritime incidents in June 1944
World War II shipwrecks in the Philippine Sea
Submarines sunk by United States warships
Ships lost with all hands